"You Don't Need to Move a Mountain" is a single by American country music artist Jeanne Pruett. Released in March 1974, it was the second single from the album Jeanne Pruett. The song reached #15 on the Billboard Hot Country Singles chart.

Chart performance

References 

1974 singles
Jeanne Pruett songs
Songs written by Wayland Holyfield
Songs written by Jim Rushing
MCA Records singles
1974 songs